The Noah's Ark silver coins are Armenian bullion coins issued since 2011. They are available in various sizes with a fine weight between  ounce and 5 kg in silver of 999/1000 fineness. The 1 troy oz. coin has a nominal value of 500 Drams and is a legal tender in Armenia.  The coin is produced by the Leipziger Edelmetallverarbeitungs GmbH, an affiliated company of Geiger Edelmetalle.  The motif of the coin remains constant, similar to other bullion coins such as the Canadian Silver Maple Leaf, the Vienna Philharmonic, or the American Silver Eagle.

Background 
The famous biblical narration of Noah's Ark was selected as a motif for the bullion coin. The Genesis flood narrative tells how God punished mankind with a flood because of their sin, with the exception of Noah and his family. God tells Noah that he is sending a flood and gives him detailed instructions for building an ark (a large boat) and taking aboard two or more of every animal species. God later floods the entire planet underwater, but Noah is saved alive inside the ark, along with his family and a remnant of all the world's animals. The floodwaters eventually subside, and Noah's ark comes to rest on Mount Ararat.

A large area of Mount Ararat was in Armenian territory, as the border between Armenia and Turkey ran over the top of the mountain. Armenia was divided between the Soviet Union and Turkey following World War 1, and Mount Ararat became part of Turkey. However it is very much part of the country's landscape, with the most impressive view seen from the Armenian capital,Yerevan and hence a part of the national identity. The symbolic figure of Mount Ararat is still in the Coat of arms of Armenia.

Obverse 

The coin's obverse of this exclusive coin edition depicts the Armenian Coat of Arms. Underneath is the face value of the coin in Armenian Dram, the fineness, the weight and the year of issue of the coin, next to the symbol of the mint. The lettering the "Republic of Armenia” in Armenian and English language surrounds the ensemble.

Reverse 
The coin's reverse depicts Noah's Ark in the center of the motif. The white dove with an olive branch in the beak is flying towards the ark. Mount Ararat and the Sun are shown in the background. The inscription is also the name of the coin: “Noah´s Ark” in Armenian and English lettering is minted around the motif.

Material 
The Noah's Ark silver bullion coins are minted with a fineness of 999/1000. The diameter is 38.6 mm (1 troy ounce) and its edge is reeded.
Introduced in 2012 were the larger denominations and sizes of 5 ounces (1000 Dram), 10 ounces (5000 Dram), One kilogram and Five kilogram coins. Since its inauguration, more than 5 million Noah's Ark silver coins have been produced and distributed all over the world.

Mintage

Silver Proof Sets 

The proof edition is limited to 2,000 pieces. The Armenian Central Bank distributes 1,000 and the other 1,000 of them are sold in the European market by dealers.  The coins in the European market are sold as a set in the sizes of 1 oz,  oz and  oz.  The coins are numbered on the shiny spots of the edge.

2017 Gold Proof Coins 
In 2017 the coin received its accolade – it was issued for the first time as a gold collector's coin in proof quality. These strictly limited gold coins were minted with a purity of 999.9 gold, and packed in attractive boxes. Each individual coin carries a fine number engraving on the obverse side and was delivered with a certificate of authenticity.

This exclusive edition was produced in one of Germany's most modern mints, using the finest gold granules of certified origin.  The Quality, fineness and fine weight are monitored and guaranteed by the Armenian Central Bank.

In addition to the individually packed coins, a special edition coin set limited to 50 pieces was released. It contains all 4 coins with the same number, but was sold out after a very short time.

See also
 Bullion
 Bullion coin
 Inflation hedge
 Silver as an investment

References

External links 
 
 Website of the exclusive marketer 

Bullion coins of Armenia
Silver bullion coins
Noah's Ark
Ships on coins
Sun on coins
Birds on coins